Krestyansky is a rural locality (a khutor) in Butyrskoye Rural Settlement, Repyovsky District, Voronezh Oblast, Russia. The population was 54 as of 2010.

Geography 
Krestyansky is located 6 km west of Repyovka (the district's administrative centre) by road. Korneyevka is the nearest rural locality.

References 

Rural localities in Repyovsky District